The Durjoy class is a class of large patrol craft of the Bangladesh Navy. A total of four are serving the Bangladesh Navy as of 2021.

History
The Durjoy class is a class of large patrol crafts of the Bangladesh Navy, designed to meet the longer patrolling and surveillance needs in the vast EEZ of Bangladesh in the Bay of Bengal as well as to perform limited offensive roles. The ships of this class are of two variants, anti-surface warfare variant and anti-submarine warfare variant. The primary characteristics of the two variants are same but they differ in armaments and sensor suite.

Initially, a contract was signed in 2009 for two ships to be built at Wuchang Shipyard in China. The ships were of anti-surface warfare variant. The first,  (P 811), was launched on 26 August 2012, while the second,  (P 813), was launched on 27 September 2012. Both ships arrived in Bangladesh in February 2013. The ships were commissioned on 29 August 2013.

On 30 June 2014 the Bangladesh Navy signed a contract for the next two Durjoy-class vessels with Khulna Shipyard. These ships were constructed in Bangladesh under ToT from China. Keel laying of the ships was done on 6 September 2015. The first two vessels made at Khulna Shipyard were commissioned on 8 November 2017. These ships were of Anti-submarine warfare variant.

Design
The ships have a bulbous bow shape, which suggests they are designed to sustain heavy sea states. The ships have speed and range to support long missions. The anti-surface warfare ships can carry 60 personnel while anti-submarine warfare ships can carry 70 personnel. They can carry one Rigid-hulled inflatable boat and has the support system to launch it.

Electronics
Anti-surface variant
The primary sensor of these ships is a SR47AG surface and air search radar.The ship carries a Chinese TR47C fire control radar for main gun. A JRCSS combat management system (CMS) with at least three multifunction consoles is also fitted in the ships.
Anti-submarine variant
The primary sensor of these ships is a SR47AG surface and air search radar. They carries a Chinese TR47C fire control radar for main gun. For navigation, the ships use the Japanese JMA 3336 radar. To help the navigational radar, the Vision Master chart radar is used.

Armament
Anti-surface variant
The large patrol crafts of this variant are armed with a  H/PJ-26 naval gun and four C-704 surface-to-surface missiles (SSM) mounted aft. Besides, these ships have two dual Oerlikon 20 mm cannon mounted amidships which can be used for anti-aircraft role. For ASW role they have two forward-mounted 6-tube EDS-25A 250 mm ASW rocket launchers and decoy launchers.

Anti-submarine variant
The ships of this variant uses a Chinese origin single  NG 16-1 naval gun as the primary gun. Besides, they have one CS/AN2  single-barrel naval gun mounted amidships used as the secondary gun. For anti-submarine warfare role, these ships are armed with  two triple  torpedo tubes for ET-52C torpedo. This torpedo has a range of 9.4 km and speed of 42 knots.

Ships in class

See also
 List of active ships of the Bangladesh Navy
 Padma-class patrol vessel

References